The Novachord is an electronic musical instrument often considered the world's first commercial polyphonic synthesizer.  All-electronic, incorporating many circuit and control elements found in modern synthesizers, and using subtractive synthesis to generate tones, it was designed by John M. Hanert, Laurens Hammond and C. N. Williams, and was manufactured by the Hammond company. Only 1,069 Novachords were built over a period from 1939 to 1942. It was one of very few electronic products released by Hammond that was not intended to emulate the sound of an organ.

History of production
While production of the Novachord began in November 1938, it was first heard at the 1939 New York World's Fair. The Novachord Orchestra of Ferde Grofé performed daily at the Ford stand with four Novachords and a Hammond Organ. The first instrument was delivered to President Franklin D. Roosevelt on January 30, 1940 as a birthday present.

The Novachord was not well-suited to the technique of organists or pianists and required frequent adjustments to controls on the front panel to create new sounds. Like many analog synthesizers, it was much better-suited to producing "otherworldly" timbres. The instrument found its niche some years after production, shaping the sound of many science fiction film and television scores.

Production stopped because of a shortage of parts in 1942 and poor sales kept it from being built after the war. It is estimated that fewer than 200 Novachords are still in existence and considerably fewer are still in operation.  The vast majority of surviving examples are in North America, although one is known to be in the United Kingdom. As of November 2017, there is one in Australia.

Technical details
Containing 163 vacuum tubes and over 1,000 custom capacitors, the Novachord weighed nearly 500 pounds and was roughly the size of two spinet pianos. The divide-down oscillator architecture, based on vacuum-tube monostable circuits, permitted all 72 notes to be played polyphonically by deriving several octaves of notes from twelve L–C tuned top-octave oscillators. Only one tetrode per lower note was needed. A basically similar design was adopted in poly synthesizers released more than 30 years later by Robert Moog and ARP.

The Novachord featured an early implementation of ADSR with seven attacks/decay/sustain envelopes selectable by the rotary switch and sustain-pedal controlled release.  It also utilized a three-stage resonant band-pass filter network with variable damping and an electro-mechanical 6-channel vibrato unit operating on pairs of adjacent oscillators.  Each channel's vibrato frequency (~7 Hz) differed slightly. The oscillator inductors used cores mounted on flat springs.

The resulting sonic palette ranged from dense sustained string-like and vocal-like timbres to the sharp attack transients of a harpsichord or piano.

Despite its historical importance, the Novachord did not enjoy commercial success. This was partly due to instability issues and the onset of World War II: reliability issues were caused in the main by the tight tolerances required of the operating parameters of hundreds of custom components. Hammond soon offered a special upgrade to improve stability, which was no more than a low-power heater bolted inside the enclosure to reduce the effects of humidity. The instrument was not known for vacuum tube failure perhaps because the heater voltage was reduced from the typical 6.3 volts to 5 volts.

Appearances in contemporary media
Like its contemporaries, the Theremin, the Ondes Martenot and the Trautonium, the Novachord can be heard occasionally in horror and science fiction film scores including many genre films from Universal Studios and James Bernard's ethereal music for Hammer's The Gorgon (1964).  Jerry Goldsmith used the Novachord in several of his film scores and is known to have held the instrument in high regard.  It was also used for the entr'acte music in Gone With the Wind (1939). Composer Heitor Villa-Lobos included a part for the Novachord in his Symphony Nº. 7 (1945). In December 1939, Kurt Weill wrote incidental music for Elmer Rice's comedy Two on an Island  for novachord solo. Hanns Eisler used the Novachord in his Kammersinfonie op. 69 (1940).  Dimitri Tiomkin used the Novachord to create the unusual percussion quality for "The Ballad of High Noon", the Oscar-winning opening song in the 1952 film High Noon.

The Novachord can be heard on many recordings of the era.  Many songs sung by Vera Lynn, including "We'll Meet Again", were accompanied by Arthur Young on the Novachord. One of the most notable recordings to feature the Novachord is "Brother Bones" recording of "Sweet Georgia Brown" on Tempo Records TR652. The Novachord is used for the bass line on that track, but can be more prominently heard on the B side of the record playing the melody on "Margie". American jazz musician Slim Gaillard and his Quartette also recorded with the instrument on their 1947 instrumental release "Novachord Boogie" (Parlophone R 3035)

References

External links
 A detailed restoration of a Novachord with sound clips
 A modern recording of a 1939 Novachord recently restored in the UK
  US Novachord restoration project
  UK Novachord restoration project
  Virtual Novachord Software
 1942, 78 RPM recording of Parade of The Wooden Soldiers
 Video of British pianist/composer Billy Mayerl playing his Marigold on the Novachord in 1941 (British Pathé film)

Analog synthesizers
Polyphonic synthesizers
1939 musical instruments
Musical instruments invented in the 1930s